The 1964 Texas Longhorns football team represented the University of Texas at Austin in the 1964 NCAA University Division football season. The Longhorns finished the season as Orange Bowl champions. In the 1965 Orange Bowl, Tommy Nobis made one of the most famous tackles in the game's history. On fourth-and-inches, and clinging to a 21–17 lead, he led his teammates to a game-saving halt of top ranked Alabama's quarterback, Joe Namath.

Schedule
A heart-breaking 1-point loss to arch-rival Arkansas at Texas Memorial Stadium kept the Longhorns from repeating as National Champions. The Longhorns finished the regular season with a 9–1–0 record and defeated No.1 ranked Alabama in the 1965 Orange Bowl, 21–17.

1964 team players in the NFL
The following players were drafted into professional football following the season.

Awards and honors
Tommy Nobis, All-America selection

References

Texas
Texas Longhorns football seasons
Orange Bowl champion seasons
Texas Longhorns football